Nathan Williamson is an Australian rules football umpire currently officiating in the Australian Football League.

He first umpired in West Australian junior football in 2005. He continued to officiate in WA, umpiring in the 2015 and '16 West Australian Football League Grand Finals. He was on the AFL umpiring rookie list for 2015 and 2016, before being promoted to the senior list in 2017. He umpired 22 matches in the 2017 season.

References

Living people
Australian Football League umpires
Year of birth missing (living people)